Bedfordshire was a United Kingdom Parliamentary constituency, which elected two Members of Parliament from 1295 until 1885, when it was divided into two constituencies under the Redistribution of Seats Act 1885.

History
The constituency consisted of the historic county of Bedfordshire. (Although Bedfordshire contained the borough of Bedford, which elected two MPs in its own right, this was not excluded from the county constituency, and owning property within the borough could confer a vote at the county election.)

As in other county constituencies the franchise between 1430 and 1832 was defined by the Forty Shilling Freeholder Act, which gave the right to vote to every man who possessed freehold property within the county valued at £2 or more per year for the purposes of land tax; it was not necessary for the freeholder to occupy his land, nor even in later years to be resident in the county at all.

At the time of the Great Reform Act in 1832, Bedfordshire had a population of approximately 95,000, but under 4,000 votes were cast at the election of 1826, and under 3,000 in election of 1830, even though each voter could cast two votes. Although local landowners could never control a county the size of Bedfordshire in the way they could own a pocket borough, titled magnates still exercised considerable influence over deferential county voters, and the Duke of Bedford was regarded as the hereditary "patron" of the constituency.

Elections were held at a single polling place, Bedford, and voters from the rest of the county had to travel to the county town to exercise their franchise. In many other counties this could make the cost of a contested election prohibitive, since it was normal for voters to expect the candidates for whom they voted to meet their expenses in travelling to the poll; but this was less of a factor in a small county like Bedfordshire, and contested elections were not uncommon.

Under the terms of the Great Reform Act of 1832, the county franchise was extended to occupiers of land worth £50 or more, as well as the forty-shilling freeholders, but Bedfordshire was otherwise left unchanged. Under the new rules, 3,966 were registered and entitled to vote at the general election of 1832. While Bedford remained the place of election, where nominations were taken and the result declared, polling also took place at Luton, Leighton Buzzard, Ampthill, Biggleswade and Sharnbrook.

Under the Redistribution of Seats Act 1885, the constituency was abolished and the county divided into two single-member county constituencies, Biggleswade and Luton.

Members of Parliament

MPs 1290–1640

 Constituency created (1290)

Back to Members of Parliament

MPs 1640–1885

Back to Members of Parliament

Elections

Elections in the 1800s

1802: John Osborn (Tory) and Hon. St Andrew St John (Whig) elected unopposed
1806: Following the elevation of Hon. St Andrew St John to the House of Lords, Francis Pym (Whig) elected unopposed
1806: John Osborn (Tory) and Francis Pym (Whig) elected unopposed

Back to Elections

Elections in the 1810s
1812: Marquess of Tavistock and Francis Pym (both Whig) elected unopposed
1818: Marquess of Tavistock (Whig) and Sir John Osborn, 5th Bt (Tory) elected unopposed

Back to Elections

Elections in the 1820s

Back to Elections

Elections in the 1830s

Back to Elections

Elections in the 1840s

Astell's death caused a by-election.

Back to Elections

Elections in the 1850s
Egerton's death caused a by-election.

 

 
 

Back to Elections

Elections in the 1860s

Back to Elections

Elections in the 1870s
Russell succeeded to the peerage, becoming Duke of Bedford and causing a by-election.

Bassett's resignation caused a by-election.

Back to Elections

Elections in the 1880s

 

Back to Elections

See also
List of former United Kingdom Parliament constituencies
Unreformed House of Commons

Notes

References

D Brunton & D H Pennington, Members of the Long Parliament (London: George Allen & Unwin, 1954)
John Cannon, Parliamentary Representation 1832 - England and Wales (Cambridge: Cambridge University Press, 1973)
Cobbett's Parliamentary history of England, from the Norman Conquest in 1066 to the year 1803 (London: Thomas Hansard, 1808) 
F W S Craig, "British Parliamentary Election Results 1832-1885" (2nd edition, Aldershot: Parliamentary Research Services, 1989)
Robert H O'Byrne, The Representative History of Great Britain and Ireland, Part I - Bedfordshire (London: John Ollivier, 1848)
J Holladay Philbin, Parliamentary Reform 1640-1832 (New Haven: Yale University Press, 1965)
Edward Porritt and Annie G Porritt, The Unreformed House of Commons (Cambridge University Press, 1903)
Henry Stooks Smith, The Parliaments of England from 1715 to 1847 (2nd edition, edited by FWS Craig - Chichester: Parliamentary Reference Publications, 1973)

Parliamentary constituencies in Bedfordshire (historic)
Constituencies of the Parliament of the United Kingdom established in 1290
Constituencies of the Parliament of the United Kingdom disestablished in 1885